Turkey competed at the 2022 Winter Olympics in Beijing, China, from 4 to 20 February 2022.

The Turkish team consisted of seven athletes (four men and three women) competing in four sports. Furkan Akar and Ayşenur Duman were the country's flagbearer during the opening ceremony. Meanwhile a volunteer was the flagbearer during the closing ceremony.

Competitors
The following is the list of number of competitors participating at the Games per sport/discipline.

Alpine skiing

By meeting the basic qualification standards, Turkey has qualified one male and one female alpine skier.

Cross-country skiing

Turkey has qualified one male and two female cross-country skiers.

Distance

Sprint

Short track speed skating

Turkey has qualified one male short track speed skater. This will mark the country's sport debut at the Winter Olympics.

Ski jumping 

Turkey qualified one male ski jumpere.

References

Nations at the 2022 Winter Olympics
2022
Winter Olympics